Seven Days is a 1925 American silent comedy film directed by Scott Sidney and starring Lillian Rich, Creighton Hale, and Lilyan Tashman. It is an adaptation of the 1909 play Seven Days, which was based upon a story by Mary Roberts Rinehart.

Plot
As described in a film magazine reviews, Jim Wilson’s guests arrive to celebrate with him his first anniversary of his divorce. Bella Wilson, his former wife, is present. Jim is infatuated with Kit Eclair. The butler is stricken with a malady. Fearing its contagion, the servants flee. Aunt Selina, Jim’s moneyed relative, arrives. Jim persuades Kit to pose as his wife because he does not wish Aunt Selina to know that he is divorced. Police announce that the house is quarantined. At bedtime, Aunt Selina supervises sleeping arrangements, putting everybody in the wrong rooms. Jim carries on a flirtation with Bella. Kit is wooed by Tom Harbison, her former lover. Jim re-wins his former wife and explains the humorous situation to Aunt Selina.

Cast

References

Bibliography
 Munden, Kenneth White. The American Film Institute Catalog of Motion Pictures Produced in the United States, Part 1. University of California Press, 1997.

External links

Lobby card at www.gettyimages.com

1925 films
1925 comedy films
Silent American comedy films
Films directed by Scott Sidney
American silent feature films
1920s English-language films
American black-and-white films
Films based on works by Mary Roberts Rinehart
Producers Distributing Corporation films
1920s American films